Proun+ is a racing game inspired by paintings by Piet Mondriaan and Wassily Kadinsky. It was developed and published by Engine Software for iOS and Nintendo 3DS in 2014-2015.

Gameplay
In this game the player has to guide a ball racing along a pipe while dodging obstacles on the way.

Reception

The iOS version received "favorable" reviews, while the 3DS version received "average" reviews, according to the review aggregation website Metacritic. In Japan, where the latter version was ported and published by Rainy Frog under the name  on June 10, 2015, Famitsu gave it a score of 28 out of 40.

References

External links
 

2014 video games
Engine Software games
IOS games
Nintendo 3DS games
Nintendo 3DS eShop games
Racing video games
Video games developed in the Netherlands
Single-player video games